Walter Franklin Lineberger (July 20, 1883 – October 9, 1943) was an American businessman and politician who served as a U.S. Representative from California from 1921 to 1927.

Early life and career
Born near Whiteville, Tennessee, Lineberger attended the local public schools, the Agricultural and Mechanical College of Texas, and the Rensselaer Polytechnic Institute, Troy, New York. He engaged in mining and agriculture in Mexico. In 1911, he moved to Long Beach, California, where he worked as a farmer and then as a banker. He served as president of the Guarantee Bond & Mortgage Co., Inc. He joined the Engineer Officers' Reserve Corps of United States Army in June 1917 and served with the 116th, 1st, 107th and 115th Engineer Battalions until he was discharged in March 1919 at the rank of major. He served in France during World War I from December 1917 until March 1919 and received the Croix de guerre.

Congress 
Lineberger was elected as a Republican to the Sixty-seventh Congress to fill the vacancy caused by the death of United States Representative-elect Charles F. Van de Water in California's Ninth Congressional District. He won a special election on February 15, 1921, by a vote of 32,442 to 21,056 for Prohibition candidate Charles H. Randall, whom Van de Water had defeated for re-election three months earlier. Lineberger had 58.5% of the vote to Randall's 38.0%.

Re-elected to the Sixty-eighth and Sixty-ninth Congresses, Lineberger served in the House of Representatives from April 11, 1921 to March 3, 1927. He won reelection with 59.1% of the vote in 1922 and with 63.9% in 1924. Lineberger did not seek renomination to the House in 1926, but was an unsuccessful candidate for the Republican nomination as United States Senator.

Death
He died on October 9, 1943, in Santa Barbara, California, and was interred in Santa Barbara Cemetery.

References

Sources

External links

1883 births
1943 deaths
People from Long Beach, California
People from Whiteville, Tennessee
Military personnel from Tennessee
Rensselaer Polytechnic Institute alumni
Texas A&M University alumni
Republican Party members of the United States House of Representatives from California
20th-century American politicians
Burials at Santa Barbara Cemetery
Recipients of the Croix de Guerre 1914–1918 (France)
United States Army officers
United States Army personnel of World War I